The following article gives a list of Gaelic games governing bodies, county boards and associations around the world. The principal governing body is the Gaelic Athletic Association (GAA).

Each county has two principal competitions: a more prestigious championship which is typically a single-elimination tournament restricted to the elite clubs, and a league which is a round-robin tournament that provides game time for lesser players while the elite players are with their county teams.

The two dominant sports of the Gaelic games are traditionally played in separate regions of Ireland. Hurling is traditionally played mainly in the provinces of Munster and Leinster, whereas football is played in every county but is dominant in Ulster and Connacht and certain parts of the other provinces.

Europe

Ireland
The island of Ireland is divided by province, originally based on the historic four provinces of Ireland as they were set in 1610. Each province consists of several counties.

Munster GAA
The traditional hurling-football divide in Munster runs along a line from Tubber in north County Clare through Corofin to Labasheeda. Across the Shannon in County Limerick the line divides the footballing territory in the hilly west Limerick from the hurling territory in the lush lowlands of east and central Limerick. In County Cork the line also divides east from west, starting at Mallow and extending south towards the city of Cork and on to the coast. Further west beyond the footballing west Cork is the almost entirely footballing territory in County Kerry, with only a very small hurling region north of Tralee in Ardfert, Ballyheigue and Causeway. The entire counties of Tipperary and Waterford are considered to be traditionally hurling regions.

Leinster GAA
In Leinster the traditional hurling region is located in the south west of the province. The entire County Kilkenny is considered hurling territory, with very little football activity. Most of County Wexford is in the hurling region along with Counties Carlow, Laois and Offaly. The other Leinster counties are considered footballing counties.

Connacht GAA
Connacht is almost entirely Gaelic football territory, with only Galway competing in the Liam MacCarthy Cup. In County Galway the hurling-football divide follows a line from Galway City to Ballinasloe. The divide in Galway probably stands out more than in other counties. The hurling territory in Galway stands out strongly from the rest of the province; as a result, the Galway team plays in the Leinster Championship. Another very small hurling region is in eastern County Mayo around Ballyhaunis.

Ulster GAA
Ulster is also almost entirely a footballing region; the hurling region is located in the Glens of Antrim. and on the Ards Peninsula in eastern County Down.

British GAA
London enters a team in the All-Ireland Senior Football Championship via the Connacht Senior Football Championship.

Warwickshire has had some success in hurling at a junior level.

Lancashire fielded a team in the National Hurling League for the first time in 2018.

Gaelic Games Europe
This is the governing body in continental Europe.

German clubs formed a union in Berlin in 2015 known as the Deutscher Bund Gälischer Sportarten.

North America

Canada
The Canadian GAA oversees Gaelic games across Canada.

United States
The New York GAA administrates in the New York metropolitan area. A county team participates in the All-Ireland Senior Football Championship via the Connacht Senior Football Championship, where it occasionally provides a challenge for opponents. Despite suffering the loss of two players to sendings off early in the second half, New York gave Galway a scare in 2010, though eventually capitulating by 2-13 to 0-12. A late burst in 2016 took New York to within one point of opponents Roscommon, which had contested the National Football League Division 1 semi-finals only one month earlier.

The USGAA oversees the rest of the country.

Australasia
The Australasia GAA oversees Gaelic games in Australia and New Zealand. It also oversees inter-state matches in Australia.

Asia
The Asian GAA oversees Gaelic games across Asia, but also Oceania (with the exception of Australia and New Zealand, which is overseen by the Australasian GAA).

Links
 County (Gaelic games)
 Dual county

See also
 Geography of association football
 Geography of Australian rules football

References

Gaelic games
Gaelic games terminology